The Fairmont Century Plaza is a landmark 19-story luxury hotel in Los Angeles. Located in Century City, the hotel forms a sweeping crescent design fronting the Avenue of the Stars, adjacent to the twin Century Plaza Towers and the 2000 Avenue of the Stars complex. At the time of its opening in 1966, the Century Plaza Hotel was the highest building in Century City, with views extending all the way to the Pacific Ocean. It was also the first hotel to have color televisions in all of its rooms. The hotel closed for renovations in 2016, and reopened on September 27, 2021. It is now operated by Fairmont Hotels and Resorts, and it is a member of Historic Hotels of America.

History 
The new owners conceived Century City as "a city within a city" with the arc-shaped, 19-story, 750-room Minoru Yamasaki-designed Century Plaza as the centerpiece of the new city.

When the Century Plaza began operating in 1966, its doormen wore red Beefeater costumes. The hotel was managed by Western International Hotels, which later changed its name to Westin Hotels. The hotel's ballrooms became the center for numerous high-profile events, including an opening charity gala in 1966 emceed by Bob Hope, who with singer Andy Williams entertained Ronald and Nancy Reagan and Walt and Lillian Disney. In 1967, 1,300 club-swinging police clashed with about 10,000 Vietnam War demonstrators as President Johnson spoke at a Democratic fundraiser at the hotel. On August 13, 1969, President Richard Nixon hosted a lavish state dinner in the Los Angeles Ballroom to celebrate the Apollo 11 moon landing astronauts.

In 1984, the hotel added a 322-room tower on the south portion of the property, adjacent to Olympic Boulevard. The Tower at Century Plaza was marketed as a luxury wing of the hotel and increased capacity to 1,072 rooms. Ronald Reagan by arrangement signed in as the first guest of the just completed Tower, while then Century Plaza Vice-President and Managing Director William Quinn greeted him on December 27, 1984. In 1999 the hotel rededicated its penthouse suite, the entire 32nd floor the Ronald Reagan Suite, attendees including Nancy Reagan. While Reagan was in office, he stayed in the Tower so frequently the media dubbed it his Western White House. President Reagan had recently celebrated his re-election to a second term as President on the stage of the Los Angeles Ballroom in the original Century Plaza Hotel on November 6, 1984. In 2000, soon after Westin was acquired by Starwood, the Tower was converted into a separate hotel under a more luxurious Starwood brand, The St. Regis Los Angeles. That hotel was then sold by the owners of the Century Plaza in 2005 to developers who closed it for conversion to residential use. With its 1980s ceilings too low to meet modern residential demands, the relatively new building was razed to make way for The Century, a high-rise condominium completed in fall 2009.

In 2006, after being managed for its entire forty-year history by Westin Hotels, the property was taken over by Hyatt Hotels and renamed Hyatt Regency Century Plaza. However, the sign above the main entrance reading The Century Plaza was left unchanged.

Sunstone Hotel Investors Inc. bought the Hyatt Regency Century Plaza in 2005 for $293 million and then spent $22 million upgrading the guest rooms and common areas. On June 1, 2008, Sunstone sold the Hyatt Regency Century Plaza to Next Century Associates for $366.5 million. The sale price of $505,000 per room was one of the highest-paid for a hotel in California. On December 18, 2008, the new owners announced plans to demolish the hotel and build a pair of fifty-story towers in its place. On April 28, 2009, The Century Plaza Hotel was added to The National Trust for Historic Preservation's list of the 11 most endangered historic places in America. In February 2010, the developer announced that it would renovate the historic hotel building and convert some of the floors to condominiums, rather than demolishing and replacing the building as previously proposed.

The hotel closed on March 1, 2016 to begin the $2.5 billion overhaul. It ceased to be operated by Hyatt at this time. The two residential towers (named Century Plaza North Tower and Century Plaza South Tower) that were to replace the hotel were, instead, built behind it. Designed by Pei Cobb Freed, Gensler, and Marmol Radziner, they contain 268 condominiums. The original 726-room hotel tower has been rebuilt with 400 much larger guest rooms and 63 condominiums. The hotel reopened on September 27, 2021 as the Fairmont Century Plaza, managed by Fairmont Hotels and Resorts. The Fairmont Century Plaza was then inducted into Historic Hotels of America, a program of National Trust for Historic Preservation, in 2022.

Notable people and events

The Century Plaza has played host to various celebrities, foreign dignitaries, and presidents; among them, Marshal Josip Broz Tito, Moshe Dayan, Lyndon Johnson, Ronald Reagan, Prince Philip, and David Ben-Gurion. The hotel was the venue for the 1967 Emmy Awards, and the 1970 and 1971 Grammy Awards. It was also the venue for the 2009 and 2010 Visual Effects Society's prestigious annual awards ceremony. In early 
2022 the newly re-opened Hotel hosted the Academy Awards Nominees lunch, the Critics Choice awards, and the Producers Guild Awards honouring George Lucas.

In popular culture
The Century Plaza Hotel's dramatic curved facade is seen in the 1980 film, 9 To 5, both from a distant establishing shot and from one of the balconies, when the character Missy Hart is staying in the hotel.

The Century Plaza Hotel is featured in the 2008 video game, Midnight Club: Los Angeles, and is mimicked in the 2004 video game, Grand Theft Auto: San Andreas.

References

External links 

 Fairmont Century Plaza official website
 Fairmont Century Plaza official chain webpage
 Century Plaza condominiums official website
 Seeing-stars.com: Los Angeles Landmarks, Century Plaza Hotel
 Los Angeles Conservancy: "The Century Plaza Hotel history and its planned demolition" article
  Los Angeles Times'.com: "Century Plaza as L.A. Statement"−(June 1, 2009)
 Story of the making of the Ronald Reagan Suite at the Century Plaza Tower — with photos.
 Story of the Century Plaza Hotel, Century City — with photos, Fox back lots, and hotel's 30th anniversary exhibits (1996).

Hotels in Los Angeles
Century City, Los Angeles
Skyscraper hotels in Los Angeles
Hotels established in 1966
Hotel buildings completed in 1966
1966 establishments in California
Minoru Yamasaki buildings
Modernist architecture in California
Fairmont Hotels and Resorts
Historic Hotels of America